Wagoora is a tehsil and a small town in Baramulla district of Jammu and Kashmir, India. Its pincode is 193109. It is located about 20 kilometres from District headquarter Baramulla, 13 kilometres from famous apple town Sopore and 49 kilometres from Srinagar, the summer capital of Kashmir. It is known for its production of apples. The population of Wagoora town is more than 2829 as per 2011 census (Excluding adjoining areas of Durhama 698 and Watergam 2378)and a literacy rate of 71.29% (Excluding adjoining areas of Durhama 67.37% and Watergam 67.58%). Wagoora town, which was given the Tehsil status recently in the year 2013 is a Block Headquarter and is thus a centre of socio-economic and political-social needs of this vast area of Ningli region of North Kashmir. Ningli is a tributary of Jhelum River and is the main source of irrigation and drinking water to Wagoora tehsil and the only source of water to several villages of Kreeri tehsil and especially Kreeri which are devoid of water resources. Besides Ningli a distributory of Ningli viz. Khalri also plays its part in irrigating a vast area of agricultural land of the town. 

The earliest traces of human settlements in the Wagoora date back to the 3rd millennium BC. With a very rich cultural legacy, Wagoora has been the birthplace of many erudite personalities and well-read poets. Among these, some have made their mark across the international literary circles. Mohammad Ramzan Firdousi, Syed Kirmani and Farooq Wagoori, whose literary works are being taught in the curriculum of Jammu and Kashmir Board. Because of immense contribution to the literature of Kashmir, Wagoora has also been the seat of religious learning and the centre for Islamic guidance. Wagoora has produced some great administrators and bureaucrats like Er. Gh. Mohidin Akhoon from Durhama( Retired SE North Kashmir), Shazia Tabassum District and Sessions Judge from Wagoora, Dr Showkat Ahmad Parray IAS (41st rank in 2013 and 246th rank in 2008-09) of village Vizer and Gulzar Ahmad Wani IAS (341st rank in 2010)of Darwa belong to Wagoora tehsil. With an enchanting landscape, Wagoora has a strong agricultural area where people grow crops such as rice, maize, and pulses while the main form of agriculture is apple cultivation. Although a good number of people are working in the public sector, however, a major chunk of the population is still associated with agricultural activities. Wagoora is turning into a new business hub in the area with a vast market, Wagoora attracts shopkeepers from the whole district to establish their business and grow. A number of investors have now turned to establish their small scale industrial units like food processing, copper utensils, and joinery etc. Block Development Office, Tehsil, ZEO office, Agriculture office, JK Bank, JK Grameen Bank, Baramulla Central Cooperative Bank,Block Veterinary Office, Horticulture office, PDD Sub- Division, etc.Wagoora is having a great history in terms of its role in the Feudal Period being the centre of power during the past. However Wagoora got more impetus due to its efforts regarding educational and social development especially having a great Educational Institution in the form of Government Higher Secondary School Wagoora as well as one of the budding institutions Kirmani Memorial Institute Wagoora. Recently, Women Degree College has been given by J&K government to Wagoora and for that land has been identified in the outskirts of Wagoora in Wagila village. It is worth to be mentioned that Wagoora has produced great teachers, academicians, administrators, lawyers and businessmen who have got recognition in the society. In the recent past, Prof Mohammed Assadullah Rather KAS has given us new recognition to Wagoora being a great academician as well as an administrator.

References

Cities and towns in Baramulla district
Tehsils of India